The Comanchero were primarily Hispanic traders from New Mexico.

Comanchero or The Comancheros may refer also to:
"Comanchero" (song), by Moon Ray (Raggio Di Luna)
Comanchero Motorcycle Club, an Australian outlaw gang
The Comancheros (film), a 1961 Western

See also
Comanche (disambiguation)